Roswell Bottum (November 12, 1902 – July 10, 1971) was an American lawyer and politician.

Early life and education
Born in Faulkton, South Dakota, Bottum went to George Washington University and received his law degree from the University of South Dakota School of Law in 1924.

Legal career
He practiced law in Rapid City, South Dakota and Sioux Falls, South Dakota. During World War II, Bottum worked as assistant general counsel for the Reconstruction Finance Corporation, in Washington, DC. From 1937 to 1942, Bottum served in the South Dakota House of Representatives while living in Sioux Falls, South Dakota. He was a Republican.

Death
Bottum died in Milwaukee, Wisconsin after a short illness.

Notes

External links

1902 births
1971 deaths
People from Faulkton, South Dakota
George Washington University alumni
University of South Dakota School of Law alumni
South Dakota lawyers
Republican Party members of the South Dakota House of Representatives
20th-century American politicians